Houp La! is an Edwardian musical comedy extravaganza, with music by Nat D. Ayer and Howard Talbot, lyrics by Percy Greenbank and Hugh E. Wright, and a book by Fred Thompson and Hugh E. Wright. The story combines the comic financial troubles of a circus owner with a love triangle.

The original production of the show was mounted by Charles B. Cochran at London's new St Martin's Theatre, opening on 23 November 1916 and starring Gertie Millar, George Graves, Nat Ayer and Ida Adams. It was the first production at the St Martin's, which was leased by Cochran. Although the critics found the music innovative, and the cast included stars of the day, the show ran for only three months in London. A Manchester production followed.

Plot
Act I
The owner of a struggling circus, Marmaduke Bunn, has severe money troubles. In desperation, he has an accumulator bet on all the horse-races of the day, and when his fancies all romp home he is thrilled by the size of his winnings. A French girl, Liane de Rose, tries to teach Bunn some of the complications of her language. Meanwhile, Tillie Runstead, the star of the circus, is in love with her admirer Peter Carey, a rich young polo player, but is worried because to her dismay her beau's interest appears to be veering towards the circus's dancer Ada Eve.

Act II
Tillie makes good use of Ada's cloak and thus catches out her wandering lover. Sadly for Marmaduke Bunn, he finds he has made a mistake about the name of the winning horse in the day's last race, so he has won nothing, after all.

Songs
Tillie sings the title song "Houp La!", as well as "Pretty Baby" and "The Fool of the Family", and with Peter she sings the duets "You Can't Love as I Do" and "I've Saved all My Loving for You". Liane de Rose has the comic song "L'Amour est Bon".

At least four songs from the show were recorded. "Oh! How She Could Yacki Hacki Wicki Wacki Woo", an interpolated "Hawaiian" number by Albert von Tilzer, was sung in the 1916–1917 London production by Ida Adams. With a female choir and the St. Martin's Theatre Orchestra conducted by James Sale, Adams recorded the song for the His Master's Voice label at the Gramophone Company's studios at Hayes on 11 January 1917. On the same day, she recorded with Gertie Millar and Nat D. Ayer the trio "Wonderful Girl, Wonderful Boy, Wonderful Time", a song from the show by Paul Rubens, while Millar and Ayer recorded their two duets from the show.

Reception and aftermath

The play was well-received, and shared an issue of The Play Pictorial with Potash & Perlmutter in Society, but it failed to achieve a long run. It had its 100th performance in February 1917 and closed a week later. Cochran later presented it in Manchester. He wrote of Houp La! in The Secrets of a Showman (1925): "I had engaged Gertie Millar, George Graves, Ida Adams, Nat D. Ayer, Hugh E. Wright, a French actress new to London, Madeline Choiseuille – and perhaps the prettiest collection of girls ever seen on any stage in the world." He also noted that Binnie Hale had "got her first chance" in Houp-La, as Ida Adams's understudy, but that she had a "harassing debut" because Adams, having insisted on paying for her own clothes, had also stipulated that no understudy should wear them.

Reviewing the premiere, the critic of The Observer wrote:

Of the provincial production, Neville Cardus wrote in The Manchester Guardian that the music "in its impudent rhythms, adapted from the music hall, and immensely free use of the orchestra, is characteristic of [Nat D. Ayer], who has displayed more instinct for the needs of popular music than any of our native musicians."

Almost sixty years later, in 1975, a critic noted that "Houp La ... did a lot towards elevating the chorus girl to something more than a grinning background to the stars."  In 1977, a member of the 1916 cast recalled in The Listener: "There was a wonderful American woman named Ida Adams in the cast. She was spectacular! They used to keep some staff on at the bank every night, so that she could put all her jewellery back after the show."

Original cast, November 1916
The opening cast included:

Tillie Runstead – Gertie Millar
Peter Carey – Nat D. Ayer
Christopher Blewitt – Joseph Tozer
Damocles – Hugh E. Wright
Liane de Rose – Madeleine Choiseuille
Ada Eve – Ida Adams
Aggie – Daisy Burrell 
Marmaduke Bunn – George Graves
George Kunstead – Rube Welch
Lady Irene Norbury – Margot Erskine
The Hon. Diana Datchet – Elsie Scott
Annette – Binnie Hale
Betty – Ivy Tresmand
An Ostler – Robert Vincent
An Arab Tumbler – Lucy Marshall 
A Trapeze Artist – Olive Atkinson
A Bareback Rider – Cissie Lorraine 
Joan – Elizabeth Beerbohm
Peggy – Mabel Buckley
Angela – Violet Leicester
Gladys  – Pepita Bobadilla
Louie Owen – Clarice
A Lion Tamer – Mamie Whittaker
A Bear Trainer – Kathleen Gower
A Japanese Juggler – Daisy Davis 
A Cockatoo Trainer – Molly Vere 
Clowns – Dorothy St. Ruth, Amy Verity 
The Compere and Commere – Vera Neville and Valerie May

References

External links
Ida Adams sings "Oh! How She Could Yacki Hacki Wicki Wacki Woo", 11 January 1917
Nat D. Ayer sings "I Like a Place Where the Peaches Grow" from Houp La!, 1917 at YouTube

1916 musicals
West End musicals
British musicals